The Klezmatics are an American klezmer music group based in New York City, who have achieved fame singing in several languages, most notably mixing older Yiddish tunes with other types of more contemporary music of differing origins. They have also recorded pieces in Aramaic and Bavarian.

Personnel
Current members include composers Matt Darriau, alto saxophone, clarinet, and kaval, and Frank London, on trumpet and keys, Paul Morrissett playing bass and tsimbl cimbalom, vocalist Lorin Sklamberg on accordion and piano, Lisa Gutkin on violin and vocals, and David Licht or Richie Barshay on drums.

Past members include David Krakauer, Margot Leverett, Kurt Bjorling and Michael Lowenstern on the clarinet, Alicia Svigals on violin, and David Lindsay on bass. In addition, Boo Reiners, Susan McKeown, Joshua Nelson, Chava Alberstein, and Aaron Alexander have frequently collaborated with the band.

History
The group formed in New York's East Village in 1986. They have appeared numerous times on television, including on the PBS Great Performances series, with Itzhak Perlman.

The Klezmatics appeared live, in June 2003, in collaboration with the Jenaer Philharmonie of Jena, Germany.  They have also participated in cross-cultural collaborations, notably with the Romani virtuoso Ferus Mustafov, Israeli singers Chava Alberstein and Ehud Banay, American singer Arlo Guthrie, and Moroccan musicians The Master Musicians of Jajouka.

In Berlin, they worked with poet Allen Ginsberg. Trumpeter Frank London composed the score for Pilobolus Dance Theater's work, Davenen, which the band performed.  The members come from different musical backgrounds. Drummer Richie Barshay plays jazz with Herbie Hancock and Chick Corea. Violinist Lisa Gutkin came from a predominantly Celtic background before joining the band.

The Klezmatics' 20th anniversary concert took place at New York City's Town Hall on March 5, 2006. That event is included in the documentary chronicling the band's history and significance, The Klezmatics: On Holy Ground (2010). Five years later, they recorded a 25th anniversary CD at the same location.

Recordings
The Klezmatics have recorded for Rounder, Piranha, Xenophile, Flying Fish, and the now-defunct Jewish Music Group.

Wonder Wheel, released in 2006, showcased lyrics by American folk icon Woody Guthrie, selected by the band from the Woody Guthrie archive. Although the music draws primarily from a wide range of Americana, not klezmer, the album won a Grammy in the category of Best Contemporary World Music Album. Another album of Guthrie material, with music drawn from the band's more usual Yiddish, Eastern European Jewish music roots, Woody Guthrie's Happy Joyous Hanukkah, was released the same year. Guthrie's granddaughter, Sarah Lee Guthrie, has appeared with them. Other key collaborations include the music to Tony Kushner's adaptation of The Dybbuk, ""A Dybbuk: Between Two Worlds”", The Well: Klezmatics with Chava Alberstein in which poetry by several prominent Yiddish poets was set to music, and Brother Moses Smote the Water with Jewish gospel-style singer, Joshua Nelson.

Discography
1989 –  (Piranha Musik)
{| class="wikitable mw-collapsible mw-collapsed"
! Track #
! Title
|-
| 1 || Ershter Vals
|-
| 2 || A Glezele Vayn
|-
| 3 || Tantst Yidelekh
|-
| 4 || Russian Shers
|-
| 5 || Bilovi
|-
| 6 || Dzhankoye
|-
| 7 || Ale Brider
|-
| 8 || Czernowitzer Bulgar
|-
| 9 || Mazl Tov, Zeydns Tants
|-
| 10 || Schneider-Zwiefacher
|-
| 11 || Rebns Khasene / Khasene Tants
|-
| 12 || Di Zen Vet Aruntergeyn

|}
1990 – Rhythm and Jews (Piranha Musik)
1995 – Jews with Horns (Flying Fish)
1997 –  (Xenophile)

{| class="wikitable mw-collapsible mw-collapsed"
! Track #
! Title
! Notes
|-
| 1 || Shprayz Ikh Mir

|-
| 2 || Kolomeyke
|-
| 3 || Moroccan Game
|-
| 4 || An Undoing World
|-
| 5 || Mizmor Shir Lehanef (Reefer Song) || Mizmor Shir Lehanef is the first Yiddish anthem written about marijuana.
|-
| 6 || Shvartz Un Vays (Black and White)
|-
| 7 || Lomir Heybn Dem Bekher
|-
| 8 || Sirba Matey Matey
|-
| 9 || Mipney Ma
|-
| 10 || Beggars' Dance
|-
| 11 || Shnaps-Nign
|-
| 12 || Interlude
|-
| 13 || Dybbuk Shers
|-
| 14 || Fradde's Song
|-
| 15 || Der Shvatser Mi Adir (The Black Benediction)
|-
| 16 || Hinokh Yafo
|-
| 17 || Mipney Ma (reprise)
|-
| 18 || Eyn Mol

|}
1998 – The Well: Klezmatics with Chava Alberstein (Xenophile)
2003 – Rise Up! Shteyt Oyf! (Rounder)

{| class="wikitable mw-collapsible mw-collapsed"
! Track #
! Title
|-
| 1 || Klezmorimlekh mayne libinke
|-
| 2 || Kats un Moyz
|-
| 3 || Loshn-Koydesh
|-
| 4 || Tepel
|-
| 5 || I Ain't Afraid
|-
| 6 || Di Gayster
|-
| 7 || Yo Riboyn Olam
|-
| 8 || Bulgars #2
|-
| 9 || Barikadn
|-
| 10 || Davenen
|-
| 11 || St. John's Nign
|-
| 12 || Hevil iz Havolim
|-
| 13 || Makht oyf!
|-
| 14 || Perets-Tanst
|-
| 15 || I Ain't Afraid (English edit)
|}
2004 – Brother Moses Smote the Water (with Joshua Nelson & Kathryn Farmer; Piranha Musik)
{| class="wikitable mw-collapsible mw-collapsed"
! Track #
! Title
! Notes
|-
| 1 || Eyliyohu Hanovi || 2:38
|-
| 2 || Elijah Rock || 9:17
|-
| 3 || Ki Loy Nue || 6:40
|-
| 4 || Shnirele Perele
|-
| 5 || Walk In Jerusalem
|-
| 6 || Go Down Moses
|-
| 7 || Moses Smote The Water
|-
| 8 || Oh Mary Don't You Weep
|-
| 9 || Didn't It Rain
|-
| 10 || Ale Brider
|}
2006 – Wonder Wheel (Lyrics by Woody Guthrie) (JMG)
2006 – Woody Guthrie's Happy Joyous Hanukkah (JMG)
2008 – Tuml = Lebn: The Best of the First 20 Years (Piranha Musik)
2011 –  (independent release, double album)
{| class="wikitable mw-collapsible mw-collapsed"
! Disc #
! Track #
! Title
|-
| 1 || 1 || Man In A Hat
|-

| 1 || 2 || Bobe Tanz (feat. Margot Leverett)
|-
| 1 || 3 || Dzhankoye
|-
| 1 || 4 || Rhythm / Jews With Horns Medley: Fun Tashlikh / Fisherlid (feat. David Krakauer)
|-
| 1 || 5 || Dybbuk Suite: Mipney Ma / Beggars' Dance / Shnaps-nign / Di Gayster / Fradde's Song / Der Shvartser Mi Adir / Hinokh Yafo / Mipney Ma
|-
| 1 || 6 || Di Krenitse
|-
| 1 || 7 || St. John's Nign
|-
| 1 || 8 || Brother Moses Suite: Eyliyohu Havnovi
|-
| 1 || 9 || Brother Moses Suite: Elijah Rock (feat. Joshua Nelson)
|-
| 2 || 1 || Davenen
|-
| 2 || 2 || I Ain't Afraid (feat. Adrienne Cooper)
|-
| 2 || 3 || Gonna Get Through This World (feat. Susan McKeown)
|-
| 2 || 4 || Holy Ground
|-
| 2 || 5 || Moroccan Game
|-
| 2 || 6 || Hanuka Gelt
|-
| 2 || 7 || Medley: Lolly Lo / NY Psycho Freylekhs
|-
| 2 || 8 || Shnirele, Perele
|-
| 2 || 9 || Ale Brider
|-
| 2 || 10 || Tepel
|}
2016 – Apikorsim (World Village)

See also
Klezmer
Secular Jewish music

References

External links

The Klezmatics official site

Klezmer groups
Grammy Award winners
Musical groups established in 1986
Yiddish culture in New York (state)
1986 establishments in New York City
Label Bleu artists
Flying Fish Records artists